Miroslav Milošević may refer to:

 Miroslav Milošević (footballer born 1975)
 Miroslav Milošević (footballer born 1976)
 Miroslav Milošević (footballer born 1985)
 Miroslav Milošević (footballer born 1986)